Admiral Ramsay may refer to:

Alexander Ramsay (Royal Navy officer) (1881–1972), British Royal Navy admiral
Bertram Ramsay (1883–1945), British Royal Navy admiral
Charles Ramsey (Royal Navy officer) (1882–1966), British Royal Navy admiral
DeWitt Clinton Ramsey (1888–1961), U.S. Navy admiral
Francis Munroe Ramsay (1835–1914), U.S. Navy rear admiral
George Ramsay, 12th Earl of Dalhousie (1806–1880), British Royal Navy admiral
William Ramsay (Royal Navy officer) (1796–1871), British Royal Navy rear admiral